The Football at the 2019 Summer Universiade in Naples was played between 2 and 13 July. 24 football teams participated in the tournament.

Qualification
Following the FISU regulations, The maximum of 12 teams in football events where the number of entries is larger than the authorised participation level will be selected by 
 The entry and the payment of guarantee.
 Those 6 teams finishing top rankings of the previous edition will be automatically qualified.
 Those 3 teams finishing bottom rankings of the previous edition will be replaced by new applying teams.
 The host is automatically qualified
 The remaining teams will be selected by wild card system according to geographical, continental representation, FISU ranking and FIFA ranking.

Qualified teams

Men's competition

Women's competition

Draw
Following the FISU regulations, draw of pool will be based on following by.
 Previous Summer Universiade results
 Participation in previous Summer Universiades
 Continental representation
 FIFA rankings

Men's competition

Women's competition

Pools composition

Men's competition

Women's competition

Medal summary

Medal table

Medal events

References

External links
2019 Summer Universiade – Football
Results book (Archived version)

 
2019
U
2019 Summer Universiade events
Universiade